Valmore Curtis James (born February 14, 1957) is an American former professional ice hockey player who played 11 games in the National Hockey League (NHL) for the Buffalo Sabres and Toronto Maple Leafs between 1981 and 1986. The rest of his career, which lasted from 1978 to 1988, was spent in various minor leagues. James was the first African American to play in the NHL.

Early life
James was born in Ocala, Florida and raised in Hauppauge, New York. He was one of six children. James began skating and playing ice hockey in Commack, New York where his father was employed as the manager of an ice rink.

Playing career
James was drafted by the Detroit Red Wings in the 16th round, 184th overall in the 1977 NHL Entry Draft after playing two seasons in the Quebec Major Junior Hockey League (QMJHL) for the Quebec Remparts, although he never played in any regulation games for the Red Wings. He also played several seasons, in the late 1970s, for the Erie Blades, in the Eastern Hockey League (EHL). James's propensity for using hip checks garnered notoriety in the Erie County Field House, home of the Blades. He signed with the Buffalo Sabres on July 22, 1981. James made his NHL debut for the Sabres during the 1981–82 NHL season, playing seven games. James became the first Black American to play in the NHL when he debuted with the Sabres. He was not the first Black American to be exclusively trained in the country; that milestone did not occur until 1996, when Mike Grier made his NHL debut. James was the first native-born Floridian to play in the NHL.

In 1983, while playing in the American Hockey League (AHL), under the direction of rookie coach Mike Keenan, James scored the winning goal for the Rochester Americans in the Calder Cup.

James' next NHL stint came in the 1986–87 NHL season with the Toronto Maple Leafs, playing four games. As an African-American, James often faced situations at all levels of his career where he was the victim of incidents of racial prejudice from opposing fans, and, sometimes, opposing players.

On the ice, James became revered for his fighting ability. Spirited bouts and victories over noted enforcers Terry O'Reilly and John Kordic were part of his record. One of the NHL's all-time top enforcers, Dave Brown, singled out James as one of the hardest punching players, and toughest opponents, he had ever fought. After 14 professional NHL hockey games, a shoulder injury forced James to retire from the sport in 1988. After retirement, he taught hockey for 10 years.

Post-hockey life
After retiring, James settled in the Niagara Region with his wife. His autobiography Black Ice: The Val James Story was released by ECW Press for worldwide distribution in February 2015, coinciding with Black History Month. In January 2017 ECW Press re-released the book in paperback format, again coinciding with Black History Month.

Career statistics

Regular season and playoffs

See also 
 Willie O'Ree, first Black Canadian player in the NHL

References

External links
 

1957 births
Living people
20th-century African-American sportspeople
21st-century African-American people
African-American ice hockey players
American men's ice hockey left wingers
Buffalo Sabres players
Detroit Red Wings draft picks
Erie Blades players
Flint Spirits players
Ice hockey people from Florida
Ice hockey players from New York (state)
Newmarket Saints players
People from Long Island
Quebec Remparts players
St. Catharines Saints players
Sportspeople from Ocala, Florida
Toronto Maple Leafs players